The Pruitt-Igoe Myth is a 2011 documentary film detailing the history of the Pruitt–Igoe public housing complex in St. Louis, Missouri, and the eventual decision to raze the entire complex in 1976.

The documentary argues that the violent social collapse within the Pruitt-Igoe complex was not due to the demographic composition of its residents, but was a result of wider, external social forces, namely the declining economic fortunes of St. Louis, the resulting impact upon employment opportunities, and the project's failure to meet occupancy projections from the start and therefore to meet monthly income projected to cover maintenance costs. Furnaces made to incinerate garbage failed, pipes/plumbing failed, and more issues kept on to the point residents stopped paying rent.

Synopsis 

The film begins with a former resident of the Pruitt–Igoe public housing complex returning to the site of the buildings in the north side of St. Louis, and noting that in spite of the decades since the planned demolition of the buildings, the site remains largely vacant.  It continues by detailing the decision by the city to replace 19th century tenement housing with high-rise public housing, ultimately designed by Minoru Yamasaki (later the famed designer of the World Trade Center) in the modernist style as thirty-three 11-floor buildings.

Interviews with former residents, archival images, and film are used to tell first impressions about moving into Pruitt-Igoe and the steady deterioration of living conditions during the 1960s and early 1970s before the destruction by planned implosion between 1972 and 1976.

The film takes issue with the various explanations for the failure of the Pruitt-Igoe complex that have developed since its demolition, including that it was the fault of the modernist theory of architecture itself (an explanation developed by architectural historian Charles Jencks)
or of the general concept of public housing.

Instead, the explanation offered is that the fate of the Pruitt-Igoe project was determined by the declining population and industrial base in St. Louis after World War II.
The documentary argues that this process left few jobs for the remaining residents, thus reducing funds available for maintenance and security of the buildings, which were planned to be paid for by tenant rents even as residents grew poorer and the living conditions in the project deteriorated.

Reception
The Pruitt-Igoe Myth has a rating of 89% on Rotten Tomatoes based on 19 reviews, and a rating of 70 (out of 100) on Metacritic based on 8 reviews.  It was nominated for a Satellite Award in 2012 in the category of Best Documentary Film. It also won the International Documentary Association's ABC News VideoSource Award for best use of archival footage.

See also
Pruitt–Igoe
Urban decay
History of St. Louis (1905–80)

References

External links
 
 

2011 films
American documentary films
Documentary films about urban studies
Documentary films about African Americans
History of St. Louis
Documentary films about cities in the United States
Films shot in St. Louis
Films set in St. Louis
Documentary films about Missouri
2010s English-language films
2010s American films